Manohar Shankar Oak (Devanagari: मनोहर शंकर ओक) (May 27, 1933 – May 11, 1993) was a Marathi poet, novelist, and translator from Maharashtra, India.

Oak led a Bohemian life style. An influence of English poets like Allen Ginsberg can be discerned in his poetry. The background of Mumbai metropolis often appears in his poems.
According to critique Poet SHRIDHAR TILVE he  developed his own meters of free verse in poems like HE PRIYATAM ANDHAR and marathisised the sanskrut wordification in such a style that it has changed the flavour of Marathi poetic language.

An Anthology of Marathi Poetry, 1945-65 by Dilip Chitre  contains translations of some of Oak's poems.
Ref:
TIKAHARAN BY Shridhar Tilve SHABDWEL PRAKASHAN 1999

Works

Collections of poems
 Aaitya Kavita
 Manohar Oakanchya Ainshi Kavita (posthumous publication)

Novels
 Charsi
 Antarvedi

Marathi-language writers
Marathi-language poets
1933 births
1993 deaths
20th-century Indian poets
Indian male poets
Poets from Maharashtra
20th-century Indian male writers